National Clinical Impact Awards are awarded within the English National Health Service to consultants and academic GPs who perform 'over and above' the standard expected of their role.  In January 2022 reforms were announced. There will be more awards but at lower levels. There are 3 levels rather than 4. They will still run for 5 years. There will be 350 national 3 awards worth £40,000 per year, 1000 national 2 at £30,000 per year and 1650 national 1 awards at £20,000 per year. For the first time those who work less than full time, mostly women, will get the full value instead of pro-rata.  Local award schemes, managed by individual employers, are not affected.

The Clinical Excellence Awards scheme was established in 2003.  There was a similar scheme in the NHS in Northern Ireland, but there has been no award scheme run for several years.  In the Welsh NHS there are commitment awards for consultants. In Scotland there is a similar scheme run by the Scottish Advisory Committee on Distinction Awards.  The schemes are intended to reward consultants who show commitment to the NHS - i.e. do not practice privately.

Administration
The administration of the scheme nationally is in the hands of the Advisory Committee on Clinical Excellence Awards.  There are 12 levels of award. Levels 1-8 are awarded locally by employing NHS Trusts, and levels 10-12 (silver, gold and platinum hereafter) are awarded nationally. Level 9 awards can be awarded locally or nationally, and are referred to as bronze. In 2016-17 awards were worth £2,986 for level one, £35,832 for bronze, £47,110 for silver, £58,888 for gold and £76,554 for platinum annually.  Payments are pensionable.  Consultants have to reapply after 5 years and a small minority lose their award.  25,300 consultants in England and Wales (54%) received a local or national excellence award in 2016-17.  Rates have not increased since 2010 and the number of awards has been reduced. Rules have changed so that renewal is no longer automatic. Radical changes or abolition were repeatedly suggested as part of the consultant contract negotiations from 2010 and in 2018 radical changes to the local scheme were agreed between NHS Employers and the British Medical Association. New points will be time limited for between one and three years, the award will not be pensionable and will paid annually by lump sum.  These changes will not apply to the national scheme.

Applicants are assessed in five areas:
 Domain 1 – Delivering a High Quality ServiceEvidence should show achievements in delivering a service which is safe, quality assured, and where opportunities for improvement are consistently sought and implemented.
 Domain 2 – Developing a High Quality ServiceEvidence should show how applicants have significantly enhanced the quality and safety of the local service(s) more widely within the NHS.
 Domain 3 – Leadership and Managing a High Quality ServiceEvidence should show how applicants have made a substantial personal contribution managing a local service, or national/international health policy development.
 Domain 4 – Research and InnovationEvidence should show how applicants have made a contribution to research over and above their contractual obligations.
 Domain 5 – Teaching and TrainingEvidence should show how teaching and training forms a major part of the contribution applicants make to the NHS, over and above contractual obligations.

The nature of the scheme tends to reward academic clinicians who can produce impressive and well documented research.

The coalition government conducted a review of the scheme whose report was published in 2012.

History
The earlier scheme of distinction awards was established at the foundation of the NHS in 1948 as part of Aneurin Bevan's efforts to win support from doctors by "stuffing their mouths with gold".

The Royal Commission on the National Health Service described the system of distinction awards in 1979. Awards were made on the advice of the Advisory Committee on Distinction, a predominantly professional body traditionally headed by a distinguished doctor. The total value of awards was about £20m per annum, 10% of total consultant remuneration. About half of all consultants received an award during their careers. At any one time, just over a third were award holders. There were four levels of award, with annual values ranging from £2,664 for level C with 3421 beneficiaries to £11,880 for A+ awards of which there were 140. Awards were then secret, and there was criticism that most went to consultants in teaching hospitals and the more glamorous specialities.

In 2015-16 £157 million was paid to 2,948 consultants in England and Wales. In 2016-17 £147 million was paid to 2,779 consultants.  300 awards were made in 2017.

In 2019 the Care Quality Commission suggested that awards should be withheld from doctors at trusts in special measures.

References

External links
 The Clinical Excellence Awards Scheme
 Advisory Committee on Clinical Excellence Awards
 Ministerial statement on the awards review
 Scottish Advisory Committee on Distinction Awards

National Health Service (England)